Daria Dolgorukova (1639-1669), was a Ukrainian Hetmana by marriage to Ivan Briukhovetsky, Hetman of Zaporizhian Host (r. 1663–1668).  She was from a Russian family.  She is known in connection to a witch trial - after her miscarriage, her spouse persecuted and executed several women accused of having caused it by use of magic.  After the death of her husband, she was imprisoned by his successor.

References

17th-century Ukrainian people
People from the Cossack Hetmanate
People accused of witchcraft
17th-century Russian people
1639 births
1669 deaths